Club Deportivo River Ega is a Spanish football team based in Andosilla in the autonomous community of Navarre. Founded in 1926, it plays in Regional Preferente. Its stadium is Campo de Fútbol Andola with a capacity of 1,500 seaters.

It is the formative club of Carlos Gurpegui, an important player for Athletic Bilbao, who was raised locally.

Season to season

8 seasons in Tercera División

References

External links
Unofficial website
navarrafutbolclic.com profile  
Futbolme.com profile

Football clubs in Navarre
Association football clubs established in 1926
Divisiones Regionales de Fútbol clubs
1926 establishments in Spain